Lampranthus tenuifolius, the Narrow-leaf Brightfig, is a critically endangered species of succulent plant that is endemic to the Cape Flats Dune Strandveld around Cape Town, South Africa.

Description
This tiny species of Brightfig is normally not more than 10–15 cm in height. It produces bright pink and violet flowers.

Distribution
This plant is naturally restricted to the coastal dune Strandveld vegetation of the Cape Flats, Cape Town. Here it grows in mildly alkaline or neutral sands.

Threats and Conservation
In the last few decades, Lampranthus tenuifolius has lost most of its natural habitat and over 80% of its subpopulations, to farming and the urban sprawl of Cape Town. It is currently classified as Critically Endangered by the IUCN

Two tiny and fragmented patches of this plant remain, totalling roughly 100 plants. This tiny population is still decreasing - now mainly due to invasive alien plants and coastal developments.

Synonyms
  Mesembryanthemum tenuifolium L. (1753)

Citations

References
 Il. Handbook succulent plants: Aizoaceae F-Z : 105 (2001).
 AFPD. 2008. African Flowering Plants Database - Base de Donnees des Plantes a Fleurs D'Afrique.
 Gibbs Russell, G. E., W. G. Welman, E. Reitief, K. L. Immelman, G. Germishuizen, B. J. Pienaar, M. v. Wyk & A. Nicholas. 1987. List of species of southern African plants. Mem. Bot. Surv. S. Africa 2(1–2): 1–152(pt. 1), 1–270(pt. 2).

Aizoaceae
Taxa named by N. E. Brown
Taxa named by Carl Linnaeus